Festival Chorobná 2001 is the fourth studio album by the Slovak punk rock/comedy rock band Horkýže Slíže, released in October 2001. The album is presented as a fictional music festival with bands like Spitipáter, Protektív Kaučuk and Gulevátor, but in fact all of the material is played by Horkýže Slíže with the exception of Ray Corte's guest appearance on "Chrobák". This is the last album on which the drummer Martin Košovan is playing before leaving the band.

Track list

Personnel
 Peter Hrivňák (Kuko) – vocals, bass guitar
 Mário Sabo (Sabotér) – guitar, backing vocals
 Juraj Štefánik (Doktor) – guitar, backing vocals
 Martin Košovan (Košo) – drums

Guests
 Ray Corte (track 13)
 Conrad Toft (track 18)
 Ina (tracks 7, 8)
 Maja Sabová a Danka Mičudová (tracks 2, 8)

External links 
Horkýže Slíže official website

2001 albums
Horkýže Slíže albums